Feature-oriented programming or feature-oriented software development (FOSD) is a general paradigm for program synthesis in software product lines.  The feature-oriented programming page is recommended, it explains how an FOSD model of a domain is a tuple of 0-ary functions (called values) and a set of 1-ary (unary) functions called features. This page discusses multidimensional generalizations of FOSD models, which are important for compact specifications of complex programs.

Origami
A fundamental generalization of metamodels is origami. The essential idea is that a program's design need not be represented by a single expression; multiple expressions can be used.  This involves the use of multiple orthogonal GenVoca models.

 Example: Let T be a tool model, which has features P (parse), H (harvest),D (doclet), and J (translate to Java).  P is a value and the rest are unary-functions. A tool T1 that parses a file written in a Java dialect language and translates it to pure Java is modeled by:  T1 = J•P. And a javadoc-like tool T2 parses a file in a Java dialect, harvests comments, and translates harvested comments into an HTML page is: T2 = D•H•P. So tools T1 and T2 are among the products of the product line of T.

 A language model L describes a family (product line) of Java dialects.  It includes the features: B (Java 1.4), G (generics), S (State machines).  B is a value, and the rest are unary functions. So a dialect of Java L1 that has generics (i.e., Java 1.5) is:  L1 = G•B. And a dialect of Java L2 that has language support for state machines is: L2 = S•B. So dialects L1 and L2 are among the products of the product line of L.

 To describe a javadoc like tool (E) for the dialect of Java with state machines requires two expressions: one that defines the tool functionality for E (using the T model) and its Java dialect (using the L model):

   E = D•H•P    -- tool equation
   E = S•B      -- language equation

 Models L and T are orthogonal GenVoca models: one expresses the feature-based structure of the E tool, and the other the feature-based structure of its input language.   Note that models T and L really are abstract in the following sense: the implementation of any feature of T really depends on the tool's dialect (expressed by L), and (symmetrically) the implementation of any feature of L really depends on the tool's functionality (expressed by T).  So the only way one could implement E is by knowing both T and L equations.

Let U=[U1,U2,...,Un] be a GenVoca model of n features, and 
W=[W1,...Wm] be a GenVoca model of m features.  The relationship
between two orthogonal models U and W is a matrix UW, called an
Origami matrix, where each
row corresponds to a feature in U and each column corresponds to
a feature in W.  Entry UWij is a function that implements the
combination of features Ui and Wj.

 Note: UW is the tensor product of U and W (i.e., UW=U×W).

     

 Example.  Recall models T=[P,H,D,J] and L=[B,G,S].  The Origami matrix TL is:

     

 where PB is a value that implements a parser for Java, PG is a unary-function that extends a Java parser to parse generics, and PS is a unary-function that extends a Java parser to parse state machine specifications.  HB is a unary-function that implements a harvester of comments on Java code.  HG is a unary-function that implements a harvester of comments on generic code, and HS is a unary-function that implements a harvester of comments on state machine specifications, and so on.

To see how multiple equations are used to synthesize a program, again consider 
models U and W.  A program F is described by two equations, one per model.  We can
write an equation for F in two different ways: referencing features by name or
by their index position, such as:

     —U expression of F
     
     —W expression of F

The UW model defines how models U and W are implemented.  Synthesizing program F involves projecting UW of unneeded columns and rows, and aggregating (a.k.a. tensor contraction):

     

A fundamental property of origami matrices, called orthogonality, is that the order in which dimensions are contracted does not matter.  In the above equation, summing across the U dimension (index i) first or the W dimension (index j) first does not matter.  Of course, orthogonality is a property that must be verified.  Efficient (linear) algorithms have been developed to verify that origami matrices (or tensors/n-dimensional arrays) are orthogonal.  The significance of orthogonality is one of view consistency.  Aggregating (contracting) along a particular dimension offers a 'view' of a program.  Different views should be consistent: if one repairs the program's code in one view (or proves properties about a program in one view), the correctness of those repairs or properties should hold in all views.

In general, a product of a product line may be represented by n expressions, from  n orthogonal and abstract GenVoca models G1 ... Gn.  The Origami matrix (or cube or tensor) is an n-dimensional array A:

      

A product H of this product line is formed by eliminating unnecessary rows, columns, etc. 
from A, and aggregating (contracting) the n-cube into a scalar:

     

 Example.  Recall program E and model T=[P,H,D,J].  E=D•H•P=T2•T1•T0. Similarly, E's representation in model L=[B,G,S] is E=S•B=L2•L0. Synthesizing E given Origami model TL is evaluating the following expression: .

Applications
There are several of product line applications developed using Origami.  Among them include:

 AHEAD Tool Suite and Extensible Java Preprocessors
 Expression Problem or the Extensibility Problem
 Refinements and Multi-Dimensional Separation of Concerns

More applications to be supplied.

See also
 Feature-oriented programming
 FOSD metamodels

References

Programming paradigms